The Cheltenham Township Police Department is a police department that operates under the Commonwealth of Pennsylvania and Montgomery County. It patrols the 9.0 square mile township of Cheltenham, which comprises Glenside, Elkins Park, Wyncote, La Mott, Melrose Park, Laverock and Cheltenham Village. Cheltenham Police operates as the third largest police force in Montgomery County, serving over 37,000 residents, in addition to answering more than 25,000 calls in 2008.

History

Cheltenham Township Police Department was formed in February 1903 by the Township board of Commissioners. At the time of formation, there was one chief, and only seven officers. Since then, the force has expanded drastically, operating with about 84 members.  However, due to drastic budget cuts, the number of sworn personnel has dwindled to 76 in 2010-2011, 70 in 2015.  2012 saw the Cheltenham Police Department's first layoffs in the Township's history, when 2 sworn members and 3 civilian employees were laid off due to Township budget shortfalls.

The Cheltenham Township Police Department started 2017 with only 67 sworn personnel, down 19 officers from the authorized force of 86 in the late 1990s into the early 2000s. However, as of 2020 the number has increased to 73 officers.

Divisions
Cheltenham Police can be divided into four divisions: The Administrative Services Division, the Detective Division, the Patrol Division, and the Professional Standards Division.

Administrative Services Division
The Administrative Services Division consists of one Lieutenant, two Sergeants, six Police Staff, and one Secretary. This division also oversees the Animal Control Unit.

Detective Division
The Detective Division consists of nine detectives, one Detective Sergeant, and one Detective Lieutenant Commander. The detectives work cooperatively with the police officers to solve crimes, in addition to working closely with the community. The Detectives are provided with state of the art equipment necessary to solve all cases.

Patrol Division
The Patrol Division is what comprises the majority of the police force. The Patrol Division is the first group that is notified in the case of an emergency. The Patrol Division consists of one Lieutenant, eight Street Supervisors, and a Community Policing Supervisor. Each Supervisor manages four platoons, in addition to two Special Units. Many of the officers in the Patrol Division deal with educating the community, through the DARE program, and the "Neighborhood Alerts Program."

Professional Standards Division
The Professional Standards Division consists of one Lieutenant and One Sergeant, who handle and process all the township resident's complaints. In addition, the Professional Standards Division help to coordinate the training for all the Special Units. Up until March 2011, students were allowed to intern with the police department, as run by the Professional Standards Division.

Special Units
In addition to the divisions, the Cheltenham Police also includes several special units. The major units are:
Animal Patrol
Community Policing
Drug Task Force
Highway Safety
K-9 Unit
SWAT

Auxiliary Police Unit
The Cheltenham Auxiliary Police has 30 all-volunteer members, who support the Cheltenham Police. Although not armed, the Auxiliary police members are qualified to use police communications and vehicles when necessary. Auxiliary Police members can often be seen at parades, Concerts in the Park, the Township Harvest Festival, and other community events, to make sure they all run smoothly.

Community
The police serves a vital role in the community, such as educating the youth about the dangers of drugs and alcohol, bike safety, and driving. They also are present at all township events, such as the July 4th Parade, Harvest Festival in October, and the Concerts in the Park during the summer.

References

Municipal police departments of Pennsylvania
1903 establishments in Pennsylvania